Tremont House (1829– c.1895), sometimes called the Tremont Hotel, was a hotel designed in 1829 by Isaiah Rogers in Boston, Massachusetts. Notable guests included Davy Crockett and Charles Dickens.

Description
The Tremont House was a four-story, granite-faced, neoclassical building, located at the corner of Tremont and Beacon Streets, with its main entrance on Tremont. It incorporated many hotel "firsts":

 Indoor plumbing
 Indoor toilets and baths
 Reception area
 Locked rooms for the guest
 Free soap
 Bellboys

Among this long list of innovations, it is probably best known as the first hotel with indoor plumbing and running water. The hotel's water was raised by steam-powered pump to a storage tank on its roof, where it fed by gravity to the taps. Eight water closets (toilets) were provided on the ground floor. Bathrooms for bathing were located in the basement, and served by cold running water. Bathtubs were copper or tin, with local gas heating for the tub's water. Running water was also provided to the kitchen and laundry. A simple system removed the waste water to the sewage system.

During the 19th century it was socially unacceptable for women to dine alone in the public rooms of hotels. The hotel was among the first urban establishments to open a women-only dining room, referred to as a 'Ladies' ordinary'. 

The Tremont House set the standard for luxury accommodations and was the model for many hotels built in major cities at this time. One of the most notable, also designed by Isaiah Rogers, was the Astor House (1836) in New York City.

References

Images

Further reading

 Benjamin F. Stevens. Tremont House: the exit of an old landmark. The Bostonian, v.1, no.4 1895.
 Henry Lee. Boston's greatest hotel. Old-Time New England. Spring 1965.
 1857 menu from the Tremont House - University of Houston Digital Library

Former buildings and structures in Boston
Hotel buildings completed in 1829
Hotels in Boston
Financial District, Boston
19th century in Boston